Vesuvius, also known as Vesuvius Bay, is an unincorporated settlement and ferry terminal on the northwest coast of Saltspring Island in the Gulf Islands of British Columbia, Canada.  It is the eastern terminus of a ferry which connects Saltspring Island to Vancouver Island across Sansum Narrows to Crofton, which is just north of the city of Duncan.

It is named for HMS Vesuvius (1839), a ship of the Royal Navy assigned to the Pacific Station at Esquimalt in the 19th Century, and indirectly after Mount Vesuvius in Italy.

References

Unincorporated settlements in British Columbia
BC Ferries
Salt Spring Island
Ferry terminals in British Columbia